I Love a Bandleader is a 1945 American musical comedy film directed by Del Lord and starring Phil Harris, Eddie 'Rochester' Anderson and Leslie Brooks.

Main cast
 Phil Harris as Phil Burton 
 Eddie 'Rochester' Anderson as Newton H. Newton 
 Leslie Brooks as Ann Stuart 
 Walter Catlett as B. Templeton James 
 Frank Sully as Dan Benson 
 James Burke as Charles Gibley 
 Pierre Watkin as Dr. Gardiner 
 The Four Vees as The Jordan Sisters

References

Bibliography
 Foster, Charles. Stardust and Shadows: Canadians in Early Hollywood. Dundurn, 2000.

External links
 

1945 films
1945 musical comedy films
1940s English-language films
American musical comedy films
Films directed by Del Lord
Columbia Pictures films
American black-and-white films
1940s American films